The 2011–12 All-Ireland Junior Club Football Championship was the 11th staging of the All-Ireland Junior Club Football Championship since its establishment by the Gaelic Athletic Association.

The All-Ireland final was played on 12 February 2012 at Croke Park in Dublin, between Clonbur and Derrytresk. Clonbur won the match by 1-08 to 1-07 to claim their first ever championship title.

All-Ireland Junior Club Football Championship

All-Ireland final

References

2011 in Irish sport
2012 in Irish sport
All-Ireland Junior Club Football Championship
All-Ireland Junior Club Football Championship